The Queen Anne’s Bounty Act 1714 (c 19) was an Act of the Parliament of Great Britain. It was one of the Queen Anne's Bounty Acts 1706 to 1870.

The long title of the Act was:

The Act gave augmented churches legal personality as corporations. The remaining sections of the Act still in force were repealed by the Statute Law (Repeals) Measure 2018.

References

External links
 

Great Britain Acts of Parliament 1714
History of Christianity in the United Kingdom